Tazehabad-e Bani Azizi (also Romanized as Tāzehābād-e Bānī ‘Azīzī; also known as Tāzehābād-e ‘Azīzī) is a village in Bazan Rural District, in the Central District of Javanrud County, Kermanshah Province, Iran. At the 2006 census, its population was 86, in 16 families.

References 

Populated places in Javanrud County